Events from the year 1882 in Denmark.

Incumbents
 Monarch – Christian IX
 Prime minister – J. B. S. Estrup

Events
 2 January – FLSmidth, a supplier of cement production technology, is founded by Frederik Læssøe Smidth as a small "technical bureau" based in a single room of his mother's apartment.
 5 November – Carl Jacobsen's sculpture collection, which later forms the basis of the Ny Carlsberg Glyptotek, is opened to the public in his winter garden.

Undated
 A group of dissatisfied students from the Royal Danish Academy of Fine Arts founds the Artists' Studio School as a reaction to the outdated teachings at the Academy.

Births
 11 February – Knud V. Engelhardt, industrial designer (died 1931)
 25 April – Christian Mortensen, world's oldest man of his day (died 1998)
 2 May – Sophus Black, telegraph manager and art collector (d. 1960)
 19 September – Robert Storm Petersen, cartoonist, painter, humorist, writer (died 1949)
 16 November – Kai Nielsen, sculptor (died 1924)

Deaths
 28 January – Hans Jørgen Hammer, painter (born 1815)
 4 December   Wilhelm Wanscher, businessman and art collector (born 1802)

References

 
1880s in Denmark
Denmark
Years of the 19th century in Denmark